Paul T. Goldman is an American true crime documentary miniseries directed by Jason Woliner. The show revolves around Paul Finkelman, a man who uncovers fraud and deception caused by his ex-wife. According to Vulture, the show "an inscrutable blend of true crime and true-crime satire, documentary storytelling, and dramatized reenactments" of Finkelman's life." It premiered on January 1, 2023 on Peacock.

Cast and characters

Main
 Paul Finkelman as Paul T. Goldman, both in reenactments from an intended film adaptation of his story and the pseudonym he uses as an author

Recurring
 Melinda McGraw as Audrey Munson, Finkelman's second wife
 Christopher Stanley as Alan Elkins
 Michael Dempsey as Bob Thompson
 W. Earl Brown as Royce Rocco
 Dennis Haysbert as Agent Portman
 Paul Ben-Victor as Mob Boss
 James Remar as Lt. Newman

Guest
 Dee Wallace as Terri Jay
 Josh Pais as Ryan Sinclair
 Frank Grillo as Dan Hardwick
 Natasha Blasick as Svetlana
 Rosanna Arquette as Genevieve

Episodes

Production

Development
In May 2022 Peacock had given a straight-to-series order to an untitled series, with Seth Rogen set to executive produce under his Point Grey Pictures banner. Director Jason Woliner had been working on the show, in some capacity, for more than a decade.

Casting
In June 2022, Rosanna Arquette, Frank Grillo, Dennis Haysbert, Melinda McGraw and Dee Wallace joined the cast of the series, in undisclosed capacities. In July 2022, Christopher Stanley, W. Earl Brown, Josh Pais, Irina Maleeva, James Remar, Paul Ben-Victor and Hilda Boulware joined the cast of the series.

Plot 
Paul T. Goldman is loosely based on Paul Finkelman's semi-autobiographical self-published book, self-published screenplay, and self-published spinoff series. In a series of interviews, reenactments, and behind-the-scenes shots at the film set, the series describes Paul's relationship with his second wife, whom he refers to as Audrey Munson (an alias). He believes that she was living a double life as a prostitute, dating her pimp Royce Rocco and running an international sex trafficking ring. Paul's unreliability becomes more and more apparent. According to Variety, the story of Paul's life matters less than "his aggressive self-belief and his unusual personal qualities."

Reception
The show attracted attention for its ambitious and ambiguous use of satire. The New Yorker writes that "the question fueling the narrative is 'What exactly are we watching?'" and criticized the show's blasé portrayal of Paul's misogyny and revenge porn, stating that "there’s no reason to trust Woliner any more than his subject." The Daily Beast writes that the series blurs fiction and reality in a way that's nearly as bizarre as The Rehearsal but that Woliner's portayal of Paul as "a colorful loon" felt "a bit mean." Variety called the series "more cruel than dazzling."

On Rotten Tomatoes, the series holds an approval rating of 75% based on 16 reviews, with an average rating of 7.00/10. The website's critical consensus reads, "This comedic docuseries-with-an-asterisk may strike some as ethically questionable and others as too opaque to fuss over, but there's no denying that Paul T. Goldman makes an unforgettable impression."  On Metacritic, the series holds a rating of 63 out of 100, based on 11 critics, indicating "generally favorable reviews".

References

External links
 

2023 American television series debuts
2023 American television series endings
2020s American documentary television series
Documentary television series about crime in the United States
English-language television shows
True crime television series
Peacock (streaming service) original programming
Television series by Lionsgate Television